PB-39 Quetta-III is a constituency of the Provincial Assembly of Balochistan.

General elections 2018

General elections 2013

See also 

 PB-38 Quetta-II
 PB-40 Quetta-IV

References

External links 

 Election commission Pakistan's official website
 Awazoday.com check result
 Balochistan's Assembly official site

Constituencies of Balochistan